Hakea grammatophylla is a shrub of the family  Proteacea that is endemic to the Northern Territory, Australia. It is a variable, sparsely branched shrub with pink to reddish flowers from March to late winter.

Description
Hakea grammatophylla is a small variable shrub growing to a height of  sometimes erect but sparsely branched. The branchlets are either thickly or sparingly covered with flattened hairs becoming more or less smooth at flowering. Flowering occurs mostly from March to August.

Taxonomy and naming
The species was first formally described by the botanist Ferdinand von Mueller in 1868 and the description was published in Fragmenta Phytographiae Australiae.The specific epithet (grammatophylla) is derived from the Latin -  meaning "striped with fine lines" and - meaning "leaf", referring to the prominent fine veins in the leaves.

Distribution and habitat
A rare species confined to the MacDonnell Ranges extending from the George Gill Ranges in the west to the White Range in the east growing in soil pockets amongst rocky slopes and river gorges.

Conservation status
Hakea grammatophylla is considered rare due to its restricted distribution by Briggs and Leigh 1995.

References

maconochieana
Flora of the Northern Territory
Plants described in 1868
Taxa named by Ferdinand von Mueller